Rise of da Moon is the fourth studio album by American hip hop group Black Moon. It was released on October 18, 2019 via Duck Down Music. Produced entirely by Da Beatminerz, it features guest appearances from Smif-N-Wessun, Method Man and Rock.

The album was preceded by the only single, "Creep Wit Me", which was released on June 14, 2019 with an accompanying music video, as well as the music video for "Black Moon Rise", which was released on September 20, 2019.

Track listing

Personnel
Kenyatta "Buckshot" Blake – main artist, executive producer
Kasim "5ft" Reid – main artist, executive producer
Ewart "DJ Evil Dee" Dewgarde – main artist, producer, executive producer
Darrell "Steele" Yates Jr. – featured artist (tracks: 5, 6)
Clifford "Method Man" Smith – featured artist (track 5)
Tekomin "Tek" Williams – featured artist (tracks: 6, 14)
Jahmal "Rock" Bush – featured artist (track 8)
Drew "Dru-Ha" Friedman – executive producer
Rob "Giambi" Garcia – recording
Dan "The Man" Humiston – recording
Tommy "Jake Palumbo" Vick – mixing, mastering
Robert Adam Mayer – photography

References

External links

2019 albums
Duck Down Music albums
Black Moon (group) albums
Albums produced by Da Beatminerz